The Bistra is a left tributary of the river Barcău in Romania. It discharges into the Barcău near Marghita. It flows through the villages Șinteu, Voivozi, Popești, Bistra, Ciutelec, Bogei, Tăuteu, Poiana and Chiribiș.

References

Rivers of Romania
Rivers of Bihor County